Georg Wolfgang Franz Panzer (31 May 1755 – 28 June 1829) was a German botanist and entomologist.

He was born at Etzelwang in the Upper Palatinate and died at Hersbruck, near Nuremberg.

A physician, he practised at Hersbruck. A celebrated botanist, he had a very species-rich herbarium.

He also assembled a very important insect collection which was the basis of a vast work Faunae insectorum germanicae initia (Elements of the insect fauna of Germany), published at Nuremberg  between 1796 and 1813. Illustrated by Jacob Sturm (1771–1848), with more than 2,600 hand-colored plates of individual, lifesize insects, this work was issued in 109 parts over the 17-year period of its serial publication, a common pattern for illustrated natural history works in the 18th and 19th centuries.

Works 
 1781: Observationum Botanicarum specimen
 1783: Beytrag zur Geschichte des ostindischen Brodbaums, mit einer systematischen Beschreibung desselben … Nebst einer Kupfertafel
 1785: De dolore (Altorfi)
 1787: Versuch einer natürlichen Geschichte der Laub- und Lebermoosse nach Schmidelschen-Schreberschen und Hedwigschen Beobachtungen
 1793–1813: Faunae Insectorum Germanicae Initia, oder Deutschlands Insecten, 109 Teile, 2640 Kupfertafeln von Jacob Sturm, herausgegeben von Dr G. W. F. Panzer. Zweyte Auflage. [Fortgesetzt bis 1844 von] Dr G. A. W. Herrich-Schaffer
 1794: Faunae Insectorum Americes Borealis prodomus, etc.
 1795: Deutschlands Insectenfaune oder entomologisches Taschenbuch für das Jahr 1795
 1802: Symbolae Entomologicae … Cum tabulis XII. aeneis
 1802: Viro … venerabili G. W. Panzero parenti suo … gratulatur, simulque quaedam de D. J. G. Volcamero, … additis duabus ad illum epistolis H. Boerhaave et I. Pitt[on] Tournefort, … exponit D. G. W. F. Panzer
 1804: Systematische Nomenclatur uber weiland … J. C. Schaeffers naturlich ausgemahlte Abbildungen regensburgischer Insekten, etc. (D. J. C. Schaefferi iconum insectorum circa Ratisbonam indigenorum enumeratio systematica opera et studio G. W. F. P.)
 1805: Kritische Revision der Insektenfaune Deutschlands (2 Bändchen)
 1813: Index entomologicus sistens omnes insectorum species in G. W. F. Panzeri Fauna Insectorum Germanica descriptas atque delineatas … adjectis … observationibus. Pars 1. Eleutherata
 1813: Ideen zu einer künftigen Revision der Gattungen der Gräser. L.P.

References

External links
Digital Faunae insectorum germanicae
WUR Panzer and Sturm Faunae insectorum germanicae initia slideshow with sound

1755 births
1829 deaths
People from Amberg-Sulzbach
German entomologists
German arachnologists
18th-century German botanists
Botanists with author abbreviations
19th-century German botanists
19th-century German physicians
19th-century German zoologists